was a Japanese mixed martial artist and professional wrestler, also known under the ring name . Kimura was known for his work in promotions like Dramatic Dream Team, W*ING, Fighting World of Japan Pro Wrestling and All Japan Pro Wrestling, among others. He was also involved in MMA, facing Rickson Gracie at the second event of Vale Tudo Japan and being the founder of the female MMA brands AX and G-Shooto. He also competed in Fighting Network RINGS during its early years and participated in both mixed-style shoot contests and shoot style matches for the company. Kimura died of pneumonia on October 28, 2014.

Championships and accomplishments
Dramatic Dream Team
KO-D Openweight Championship (3 times)
KO-D Tag Team Championship (2 times) – with Mikami
DDT Tag League/KO-D Tag League – with Tomohiko Hashimoto (2000) and Mikami (2001)

Mixed martial arts record

|-
| Loss
|align=center| 1–2
|  Rickson Gracie
| Submission (rear naked choke)
| Vale Tudo Japan 1995
| 
|align=center| 1
|align=center| 2:07
| Tokyo, Japan
|
|-
| Win
|align=center| 1–1
|  Wayne Emons
| Submission (guillotine choke)
| Vale Tudo Japan 1995
| 
|align=center| 1
|align=center| 6:05
| Tokyo, Japan
|
|-
| Loss
|align=center| 0–1
|  Todd Hays
| Submission (guillotine choke)
| Vale Tudo Japan 1995
| 
|align=center| 1
|align=center| 2:05
| Tokyo, Japan
|

References

Japanese male professional wrestlers
Japanese male mixed martial artists
Mixed martial artists utilizing wrestling
Mixed martial artists utilizing judo
People from Gunma Prefecture
Mixed martial arts referees
1969 births
2014 deaths
Deaths from pneumonia in Japan
20th-century professional wrestlers
21st-century professional wrestlers
Ironman Heavymetalweight Champions
KO-D Tag Team Champions
KO-D Openweight Champions